Chrast is a town in Chrudim District in the Pardubice Region of the Czech Republic. It has about 3,100 inhabitants. The historic centre with the castle complex is well preserved and is protected by law as an urban monument zone.

Administrative parts

Villages of Chacholice, Podlažice and Skála are administrative parts of Chrast.

Geography
It lies in the Svitavy Uplands. The town is situated on the right bank of the small river Žejbro. Horecký Pond is located south of the town.

History
The oldest part of Chrast is Podlažice. The Benedictine monastery in Podlažice was founded in 1159. The monastery is where the Codex Gigas (or "Devil's Bible") was produced. It remains the largest extant medieval manuscript. However, it is unlikely that the book was written at the monastery due to its small size and meagre funds.

The first written mention of Chrast is from 1318. It was founded in the second half of the 13th century by monks from the Podlažice Monastery. The monastery was destroyed by the Hussites in 1421.

In 1539, Chrast was acquired by the noble Slavata of Chlum and the Košumberk family. In the early 17th century, Albrecht  Slavata had built a castle here. In 1664, Chrast was bought by Hradec Králové Bishopric. The castle served as the summer residence of several bishops. In the 18th century, it was rebuilt and extended. In 1853, Chrast was promoted to a town.

Demographics

Sights
The Baroque castle currently houses the Town Museum, which was founded in 1893. The former castle chapel is today a concert hall. The adjacent castle garden was created in 1903.

The landmark of the town square is the Church of the Holy Trinity. It was built in 1612–1618 by renewal of an old church and reconstructed to its current form in 1774. The oldest church in the town is the cemetery Church of Saint Martin. It comes from 1350. Church of Saint Margaret the Virgin in Podlažice and Church of Saint John the Baptist in Skála were both founded in 1696.

Notable people
Johann Leopold Hay (1735–1794), Bishop of Hradec Králové; died here
Antonín Machek (1775–1844), painter
Ludwig August von Frankl (1810–1894), Bohemian-Austrian writer and poet

References

External links

Virtual show

Cities and towns in the Czech Republic
Populated places in Chrudim District